Søren Kolbye Jensen (born 1 March 1984) is a Danish former professional football defender.

External links
 National team profile
 Career statistics at Danmarks Radio

Danish men's footballers
Denmark under-21 international footballers
Viborg FF players
Vejle Boldklub players
Odense Boldklub players
Danish Superliga players
Odds BK players
Randers FC players
AC Horsens players
Expatriate footballers in Norway
Eliteserien players
Danish expatriate men's footballers
1984 births
Living people
Association football defenders